Diana Dennis (born July 21, 1951) is a former professional female bodybuilder from the United States.

Biography
Dennis began competing in local contests in 1981. Her earliest success was in mixed pairs competition (where couples do synchronized posing routines to chosen music), with partner Kevin Lawrence. They won several titles, including the 1985 IFBB World Amateur competition. Dennis earned her pro card by winning the overall title at the 1985 NPC Nationals. She then established herself as one of the top professional competitors by finishing third in the Ms. Olympia later that year. She competed in a total of nine Ms. Olympia contests, finishing outside the top ten only once. As a pro, Dennis won the 1986 Los Angeles Pro Championship and the 1989 Pro World Championship. She was inducted into the IFBB Hall of Fame in 2001.

Dennis is retired from official competition, but still continues to train.

Contest history
1981 The Shrine Amateur Grand Prix - 4th
1982 Saddleback Valley Muscle Classic - 1st (HW)
1982 California Muscle Classic - 1st (HW & Overall)
1983 California Championships - 4th (HW)
1983 National Bodybuilding Fair Mixed Pairs - 2nd
1983 AFWB American Championships - 6th (HW)
1983 AFWB American Mixed Pairs - 1st
1983 NPC National Championships - 1st (HW)
1984 Orange County Muscle Classic - 1st (HW & Overall)
1984 IFBB Pro-Am Mixed Pairs - 4th
1984 NPC USA Championship - 2nd (HW)
1984 NPC Nationals - 2nd (HW)
1985 IFBB Pro-Am Mixed Pairs - 4th
1985 NPC Nationals - 1st (HW & Overall)
1985 IFBB World Amateur Mixed Pairs - 1st
1985 IFBB Ms. Olympia - 3rd
1986 IFBB Pro World Championship - 2nd
1986 IFBB Pro-Am Mixed Pairs - 2nd
1986 Los Angeles Pro Championship - 1st
1986 IFBB Ms. Olympia - 4th
1987 IFBB Pro World Championship - 4th
1987 IFBB Ms. Olympia - 8th
1989 IFBB Pro World Championship - 1st
1989 USA vs. USSR Invitational - 2nd
1989 IFBB Ms. Olympia - 7th
1990 IFBB Ms. Olympia - 7th
1991 IFBB Ms. Olympia - 6th
1992 IFBB Ms. Olympia - 5th
1993 IFBB Ms. Olympia - 15th
1994 IFBB Ms. Olympia - 10th

External links
Official website
IFBB Hall of Fame profile

1951 births
American female bodybuilders
Professional bodybuilders
Living people
21st-century American women